William Lawrence Stribling Jr. (December 26, 1904 – October 3, 1933), known as Young Stribling, was an American professional boxer who fought from Featherweight to Heavyweight from 1921 until 1933.
He was the elder brother of fellow boxer Herbert "Baby" Stribling.

Stribling was also an amateur aviator.

Background 
Born in Bainbridge, Georgia, on December 26, 1904, Young Stribling spent most of his childhood in show business with his parents Lily Braswell and William Lawrence Stribling and his younger brother Herbert Stribling. His parents were devout Christians from rural southwestern Georgia. In 1911, Stribling's family had come to Spokane on the Sullivan and Considine Vaudeville Circuit with an acrobatic act called the "Four Novelty Grahams." Ma was his trainer, donning gloves and sparring with him in the ring. Pa was his manager and promoter.

The Stribling family traveled widely as vaudeville performers with a wholesome family act that included gymnastics and balancing acts and ended with a brief boxing match between four-year-old "Strib" and his two-year-old brother, "Baby" Stribling. The act lasted several years and was so popular that it took the family through 38 foreign countries before they settled in Macon, Georgia, prior to World War I. Backstage between acts, the Striblings read the Bible together and prayed before each performance, just as "Strib" later prayed before each fight when he became a professional boxer. Regardless of where the family performed, they always went to church on Sunday and refused any physical training on the Lord's Day. "Strib" attended Macon's Lanier High School where he excelled as a forward on the basketball team that won the state championship in 1922.

Stribling was one of the best high school basketball players in the United States. He was known as a "dead shot". His team went to the national interscholastic tournament at Chicago, but he was ruled ineligible to play because of his professional boxing. At age sixteen he had his first professional fight, in Atlanta.

Stribling was also an avid and accomplished aviator who loved to fly.

Stribling was raised as a vegetarian.

Professional career 
Stribling turned professional in 1921. While still in high school, Stribling fought 75 professional bouts. After gaining favorable media attention for his first major fight, a bout which he tied with champion Mike McTigue from Ireland, "Strib" was besieged by offers to box all over the United States, Europe, South America, and Africa. People wanted to see the young prodigy of the boxing ring in person during those days before television. "Strib's" most successful year was 1925 when the family purchased a bus and toured coast-to-coast to give fans in smaller towns an opportunity to see a popular boxer in exhibition bouts.

Pa sometimes pitted him against the local champion, offering $10.00 (a substantial amount at the time) to anyone who could beat his son. "Strib" fought 33 matches that year. Moreover, the tour did much to popularize the sport, and it helped establish the athlete's reputation for clean sportsmanship and wholesome living. He never drank or smoked, and he was always careful about what went into his body.

Another cross-country tour in 1927, this time without the bus, resulted in his winning 57 straight fights with only one draw and one loss. He fought 38 bouts in 1928, winning all but two by a knockout. He ended the tour by knocking out three different opponents within four days in three different cities, no opponent lasting more than two rounds.

Macon loved the Stribling family and honored "Strib" with a parade after every major fight. In turn, "Strib" established himself as a valuable citizen. As a professional boxer "Strib" usually trained on the family farm in Ochlocknee, near Thomasville, Georgia. There on November 17, 1927, he was raised a Master Mason at Ochlocknee Lodge No. 117 (now defunct). And back in Macon on December 7, 1928, he became a 32° Scottish Rite Mason. He was created a Shriner of Macon's Al Sihah Temple on May 23, 1929.

During the peak of his career, "Strib" flew his own airplane to fights around the country and served as a lieutenant in the Air Force Reserve, taught Sunday School for athletes at Macon's Mulberry Street Methodist Church, and worshipped at Vineville Baptist Church where he was a member.

Handsome and personally appealing, the six-foot-tall, blue-eyed, brown-haired youth received offers to model clothes for major companies and to appear on the Broadway stage. He received numerous gifts from admirers, including a motorcycle on which he often had a rider, his mother. Big-name fighters had their photos made with him, including heavyweight champion Jack Dempsey, who later became one of his best friends. By 1926, "Strib's" success as a boxer had earned him over a million dollars. And there was more to come. "Strib" celebrated his 21st birthday by marrying Clara Kinney, a student at Brenau College. Clara's father was a prominent Macon businessman, and her mother was the first woman to serve on the city council. Clara's grandfather was a former president of Wesleyan College in Macon, the oldest female college in America. "Strib" and Clara had three children, the first was W. L. Stribling III, born in 1927. Although he lost his championship bid in the fight against future world champion Jack Sharkey at Miami Beach in 1929, "Strib" at 23 had fought more professional rounds than any other fighter in history, had knocked out more opponents, and had compiled other records as well.

Later in 1929, "Strib" made his first European tour where he lost by a foul to a future world heavyweight champion Primo Carnera in London and a month later defeated him in Paris in a rematch. Later in 1930, he made a second European tour, and this time defeated the champions of Germany, Great Britain, Italy, and Belgium. Back in the United States while nursing a broken left hand, he defeated the heavyweight champion of Norway. "Strib" missed his one great chance to become heavyweight champion of the world when he lost to Max Schmeling on July 3, 1931, in Cleveland, on a technical knockout in the last 14 seconds of the 15th round. The battle was a rout before it was half over; the only round Young Stribling might have won was the 4th.  According to one ringside observer, Stuart Bell, "Strib" may have landed only 30 good punches in the 15 round fight. It was the first major fight to be broadcast live over national radio. When the fight ended, "Strib" went to shake hands with Schmeling who, although swarmed by photographers, insisted on being photographed with "Strib." During the spring of 1932, "Strib" went on a boxing tour to Australia, accompanied by his wife and children, and in the fall they sailed to Johannesburg, South Africa, where he defeated the heavyweight champion of that country before a record crowd of 15,000. Early in 1933 "Strib" returned to Paris to beat, again, the champion of Belgium in a rematch. One night in Atlanta, "Strib" rose from his ringside seat and threw in the towel to stop a young boxer's brutal beating by an experienced opponent. The news reporter who witnessed the incident later wrote, "To me, this one incident did more to reveal the true character and instinct of Young Stribling than anything else—the instinct of a Christian gentleman who abhorred brutality whether at his expense or the expense of a foe."

Highlights
"Strib" fought a total of 253 recorded bouts, losing only 13. He was knocked out only once, and it was a technical KO during the final round with Germany's Max Schmeling in 1931. His lifetime achievement records include most fights by a heavyweight, most fights by a heavyweight in a single year (he fought 55), most knockouts by a heavyweight (129), and fewest times knocked out. Champion boxer Jim Corbett called him "the best heavyweight fighter for his pounds that ever lived." Setting himself at odds with boxing promoters of the 1920s, "Strib" decried the violence and cruelty associated with professional boxing, and he saw himself as a "scientific" pugilist who preferred to win over his opponent on points rather than knockouts. He gained attention from the media as an outstanding boxer beginning with his first professional fight at age 16 in Atlanta.

Death 
He died at 6 A.M, EST on October 3, 1933, at 28 years old, after a motorcycle accident which occurred 2 days prior in Macon, Georgia while travelling to a hospital to visit his convalescing wife and newborn. Injuries involved pelvic fracture and severe left foot damage which lead to amputation. He was buried in Riverside Cemetery (Macon, Georgia).

Honors 
 Inducted into the Georgia Sports Hall of Fame in 1965.
 Stribling's fight against Schmeling was named Ring Magazine fight of the year in 1931.
 Inducted into the International Boxing Hall Of Fame in 1996.http://www.ibhof.com/pages/about/inductees/oldtimer/stribling.html

Professional boxing record
All information in this section is derived from BoxRec, unless otherwise stated.

Official record

All newspaper decisions are officially regarded as "no decision" bouts and are not counted in the win/loss/draw column.

Unofficial record

Record with the inclusion of newspaper decisions in the win/loss/draw column.

Footnotes

References 
 Excerpts taken from the Nov. 7, 1927 Spokane Spokesman Review newspaper, just prior to Stribling's visit to nearby Dishman, WA.
 White, Jaclyn Weldon. 2011. The Greatest Champion that Never Was. Macon, GA: Mercer University Press.
 Elliott, Jack, "How Far was Stribling in Earnest?", The Referee, (Wednesday, 6 July 1932), p.10.
 Palmer-Stribling Fight Round by Round, The Referee, (Wednesday, 6 July 1932), p.11.
 Was Always Palmer's Master, The Referee, (Wednesday, 6 July 1932), p.12.

External links
 
 Young Stribling's Story

1904 births
1933 deaths
Heavyweight boxers
People from Bainbridge, Georgia
Sportspeople from Macon, Georgia
Road incident deaths in Georgia (U.S. state)
World boxing champions
People from Thomas County, Georgia
American male boxers
Motorcycle road incident deaths